Gemma Merna (born 6 February 1984) is an English actress and model. She is best known for portraying the role of Carmel McQueen in the Channel 4 soap opera, Hollyoaks from 2006 to 2014.

Career
Merna joined the cast of the Channel 4 soap opera Hollyoaks in August 2006. In 2007, she won Best Comedy Performance in 2007 at the British Soap Awards.
In 2008, Merna appeared on the  game show All Star Family Fortunes in a Hollyoaks v Emmerdale special. In February 2013, she appeared on All Star Family Fortunes playing against gardener, garden designer and television personality Diarmuid Gavin.

In 2009, Merna  appeared in the spin-off show Hollyoaks Later as Carmel. She also appeared in an episode of the game show Hole in the Wall.

In 2011, she appeared in the documentaries 50 Greatest Wedding Shockers and Hollyoaks Best Bits.

In 2013 and 2014, Merna was a panelist in an episode of Big Brother's Bit on the Side.

In January 2014, she was a contestant on the ITV diving show Splash!, fronted by Tom Daley, she was the first contestant to be eliminated from the show in Heat One.

On 24 August 2014, it was announced that Merna had decided to leave Hollyoaks and would leave in November 2014 in one of Hollyoaks biggest stunts. Jennifer Metcalfe – who plays Merna's on-screen sister Mercedes McQueen – announced her decision to leave the soap opera a few days after Merna's announcement. The character was killed off in an explosive train accident on 12 November 2014, with cast members and television critics praising Merna's performance in her final scenes.

On 8 September 2014, Merna appeared on the panel  show Virtually Famous, presented by Glee actor  Kevin McHale.

On 25 October 2014, Merna appeared on a special  celebrity episode of The Chase.

In 2017, Merna appeared in an episode in TV show Doctors.  She also joined former TV mum Nicole Barber-Lane as teammates on the 28 October 2017 "Soaps" episode of Pointless Celebrities.

In January 2022 Merna announced on a Instagram post that she is returning to filming.

Personal life
Merna was born in Manchester and grew up in Worsley where she attended St. George's RC High School, Walkden.

She was engaged to long-term boyfriend Ian Minton and they married in 2012.

In a 2009 interview with Closer magazine, Merna said that having a breast enlargement at the age of 21 was one of the best things she ever did and that it gave her so much confidence.

Filmography

Awards and nominations

References

External links

1984 births
Living people
English female models
Actresses from  Manchester
English television actresses
English soap opera actresses
20th-century English actresses
21st-century English actresses